Macrolaelaps is a genus of mites in the family Laelapidae.

Species
 Macrolaelaps sanguisugus (Vitzthum, 1924)

References

Laelapidae